Tommie Pierson Sr. (born January 29, 1946) is an American politician from the state of Missouri. A member of the Democratic Party, Pierson represented the 66th district in the Missouri House of Representatives from 2011 until 2017.

Pierson graduated from Beaumont High School in St. Louis, Missouri. He worked for General Motors and serves as a Baptist pastor. Pierson was elected to the Missouri House in the 2010 elections, and chaired the Missouri Legislative Black Caucus. He ran for Lieutenant Governor of Missouri in the 2016 election, but lost in the Democratic Party primary election to Russ Carnahan.

Pierson was succeeded by his son, Tommie Pierson Jr.

References

External links

Living people
Politicians from St. Louis
Democratic Party members of the Missouri House of Representatives
African-American Baptist ministers
Baptist ministers from the United States
21st-century American politicians
1946 births
African-American state legislators in Missouri
People from Ripley, Tennessee
Baptists from Tennessee
21st-century African-American politicians
20th-century African-American people